CHLC-FM is a Class B FM station broadcasting on the frequency of 97.1 MHz using an omnidirectional antenna. The station has a hot adult contemporary format.

CHLC-FM operates a rebroadcaster in Forestville, namely CFRP-FM which broadcasts on 100.5 MHz using a directional antenna with an average effective radiated power of 3,374 watts and a peak effective radiated power of 6,000 watts (class A).

Both stations were previously on the AM band. CHLC was on 580 kHz until 1996, and CFRP was on 620 kHz until 2005.

References

External links
 www.chlc.com - FM 97,1 et FM 100,5
 

Hlc
Hlc
Hlc
Baie-Comeau
Year of establishment missing